Sarah Capel-Coningsby, Countess of Essex (née Bazett; 11 July 1759 – 16 January 1838) was an English amateur artist. She specialised in making watercolour copies of old portraits of 16th century personages and other paintings, and her surviving copies in many instances are the only evidence of the now lost originals. Over a hundred of her portraits in watercolour and gouache on paper were published in the 1825 edition of Lucy Aikin's Memoirs of the Court of Queen Elizabeth, first published in 1818 as a two-volume work  and re-issued in several editions (4th edition 1819, further edition 1823). The fact that she frequently added the subject's coat of arms and other heraldic devices to her copy portraits suggests that she was knowledgeable in the field of heraldry.

Origins
She was born at Saint Helena, the daughter of Henry William Bazett of St Helena by his wife  Clarissa Penelope Pritchard.

Marriages
She married twice:
Firstly to Edward Stephenson.
Secondly, as his 1st wife, to George Capel-Coningsby, 5th Earl of Essex (d. 1839). In 1799 he succeeded to the titles Baron Capell,  Viscount Malden and Earl of Essex).

External links

Bridgeman Art Library images of 121 works of "Essex, Sarah Countess of"

References

1759 births
1838 deaths
English countesses
19th-century English painters
English watercolourists
Art copyists
Sarah